(born August 13, 1967) is a Japanese voice actress and singer, best known for voicing the lead role of Yū Morisawa / Creamy Mami in anime Creamy Mami, the Magic Angel.

Creamy Mami is known as a pioneer of the new marketing strategy, now known as “media mix”. The anime was used to promote a new, unknown idol singer. The real idol singer, Takako Ōta, acted as an idol singer (Creamy Mami) in the anime. The opening theme Delicate ni Suki Shite was her first song in the real world too. Even though Ohta was a new singer and not a trained voice actress, she voiced Yū/Creamy Mami, with great success. The anime Creamy Mami has become famous and Ohta gained popularity that still exists today.

Anime
Adesugata Mahou no Sannin Musume (OAV) as Yuu Morisawa/Creamy Mami
Arion as Pio
Magical Angel Creamy Mami (TV) as Yū Morisawa / Creamy Mami
Magical Angel Creamy Mami: Curtain Call (OAV) as Yuu Morisawa/Creamy Mami
Magical Angel Creamy Mami: Long Good-Bye (OAV) as Yu Morisawa / Creamy Mami
Mahō no Tenshi Creamy Mami: Eien no Once More (OAV) as Yu Morisawa / Creamy Mami
Majokko Club Yoningumi - A Kuukan Kara no Alien X (OAV) as Yuu Morisawa / Creamy Mami
Nausicaä of the Valley of the Wind (film) as Pejite Girl

Discography

Albums 

 1984: Creamy Takako
 1984: Graduation
 1985: Long Good-bye
 1985: Mi N Na Genki (み・ん・な Genki!)
 1985: Takako Collection
 1986: 200%
 1986: Backseat Lovers
 1986: Want
 1986: Best Selection
 1987: Pop Station
 1987: Takako Ohta Bestests!
 1987: Truth
 1988: Here, There and Nowhere
 1988: Diamond Collection
 1988: Best of Best
 1989: Thanks
 1989: Magician
 1990: Takako Ohta Vol. 1 Best Pop
 1990: Takako Ohta Vol. 2 Best Rock
 1990: Heart of Eyes
 1991: Love Ya - The Best of Takako
 1998: Takako CD-R Vol. 1
 1999: Takako CD-R Vol. 2
 1999: Takako Again...
 2000: Ohta Takako Best Collection (太田貴子 ベストコレクション)
 2004: Ohta Takako Golden Best (太田貴子 ゴールデン☆ベスト)

Singles 

 1983: "Delicate ni Suki Shite" ("デリケートに好きして")
 1983: "Bin Kin Rouge" ("Bin Kan ルージュ")
 1984: "Love Sarigenaku" ("Love さりげなく")
 1984: "Natsu ni Awatenaide" ("夏にあわてないで")
 1984: "Heartbreak Mistake" ("ハートブレイク・ミステイク")
 1985: "Tenshi no Miracle" ("天使のミラクル")
 1985: "Heart no Season" ("ハートの Season")
 1985: "Koishitara Delicacy" ("恋したらデリカシー")
 1986: "Wasure China no Aoi Tori" ("忘れチャイナの青い鳥")
 1987: "Kanjitai Emotion" ("感じたい Emotion")
 1987: "Machkado no Billy the Kid" ("街角のビリー・ザ・キッド")
 1988: "1988 - From Tokyo"
 1989: "Hurry Up!"
 1989: "Girlfriend"
 1990: "Magician (In the Midnight)"
 1990: "Makenaide (God Bless You)" ("負けないで (God Bless You)")
 2008: "Delicate ni Suki Shite" (21st century version) ("デリケートに好きして" (21st century version))

References

1967 births
Living people
Japanese voice actresses
Japanese women pop singers
Japanese child actresses
Japanese idols